Silvina Aída Batakis (born 27 December 1968) is an Argentine economist and politician, and the country’s former Minister of Economy. Previously, she served as Secretary of Provinces in the Ministry of the Interior and as economy minister of Buenos Aires Province under Governor Daniel Scioli from 2011 to 2015.

Early life
Batakis was born in Río Grande, Tierra del Fuego, and grew up in Río Gallegos, Rafaela, Taco Pozo and La Plata. She graduated with a licenciatura in Economics from the National University of La Plata in 1993. Additionally, she holds a master's degree in public finances and a master's degree in environmental economy from University of York.

Political career
Starting in 1992, Batakis held a number of public offices in the government of Buenos Aires Province. In 2009, she was appointed as cabinet chief and Secretary of Finances in the provincial economy ministry under Alejandro Arlía; in 2011, Governor Daniel Scioli designated Batakis as economy minister in her own right.

As economy minister of Buenos Aires, Batakis introduced a reform in the provincial tax revenue distribution system. The reform resulted in a tax increase and lower subsidies from the provincial government in 60% of the province's districts, and the provincial government had to request an additional $2,800 million ARS in order to supply the net loss. The reform was criticised by then president Cristina Fernández de Kirchner. In 2014, Batakis introduced a 30% spike in rural and urban property tax, excluding retirees and pensioners owning properties valued under $200,000. In addition, a previously overturned inheritance tax was reintroduced. 

During Scioli's 2015 presidential campaign, the then-governor announced Batakis was his pick for an eventual economy minister. Scioli lost the election against Mauricio Macri in the second round.

In 2019, Batakis was designated as Secretary of Provinces in the Ministry of the Interior by President Alberto Fernández and interior minister Eduardo de Pedro. As secretary, Batakis headed the negotiations for a new fiscal consensus in order to grant Argentina's 23 provinces further financial autonomy and judicial stability for the Argentine tax system.

The minister of economy Martín Guzmán resigned in 2022, amid an economic crisis. There were lengthy and conflictive negotiations between the factions of the Frente de Todos, which culminated in the appointment of Batakis, a vocal supporter of Cristina Kirchner's economic policies.

Personal life
Batakis is nicknamed La Griega ("the Greek") referring to her Greek origins. Sports-wise, she is a supporter of Boca Juniors. She has a son.

See also 

 Felisa Miceli

References

External links

1968 births
21st-century Argentine politicians
21st-century Argentine women politicians
Argentine economists
Argentine people of Greek descent
Justicialist Party politicians
Living people
National University of La Plata alumni
People from La Plata
People from Río Grande, Tierra del Fuego
York University alumni